Carroll Valley is a borough in Adams County, Pennsylvania. The population was 3,940 at the 2020 census.

Geography
Carroll Valley is located at  (39.747668, -77.378846).

Demographics

As of the census of 2000, there were 3,291 people, 1,176 households, and 952 families residing in the borough. The population density was 610.4 people per square mile (235.7/km²). There were 1,261 housing units at an average density of 233.9 per square mile (90.3/km²). The racial makeup of the borough was 96.81% White, 0.61% African American, 0.43% Native American, 0.40% Asian, 0.24% from other races, and 1.52% from two or more races. Hispanic or Latino of any race were 0.79% of the population.

There were 1,176 households, out of which 43.5% had children under the age of 18 living with them, 71.9% were married couples living together, 5.6% had a female householder with no husband present, and 19.0% were non-families. 14.0% of all households were made up of individuals, and 4.0% had someone living alone who was 65 years of age or older. The average household size was 2.80 and the average family size was 3.08.

In the borough, the population was spread out, with 29.7% under the age of 18, 4.9% from 18 to 24, 35.2% from 25 to 44, 21.6% from 45 to 64, and 8.7% who were 65 years of age or older. The median age was 35 years. For every 100 females there were 100.4 males. For every 100 females age 18 and over, there were 101.3 males.

The median income for a household in the borough was $54,659, and the median income for a family was $55,000. Males had a median income of $40,135 versus $27,090 for females. The per capita income for the borough was $21,286. About 1.7% of families and 2.2% of the population were below the poverty line, including 2.0% of those under age 18 and 2.5% of those age 65 or over.

Parks and recreation
Carroll Valley Borough has 3 lakes (2 offer public fishing and boating), 2 recreation areas, several auxiliary playing fields and a pavilion with picnic area. Carroll Commons hosts a large playground, picnic area and a pavilion. The park has a beach volleyball court, basketball court, bocce court, horseshoe pits, and shuffle board. Public restroom facilities are open from dawn to dusk daily on the Commons grounds from April 15 until October 1.

References

External links
 Carroll Valley Borough official website

Boroughs in Adams County, Pennsylvania
Boroughs in Pennsylvania
Populated places established in 1974